Alofiana Khan-Pereira (born 1 November 2001) is an Australian professional rugby league footballer who plays as a  for the Gold Coast Titans in the NRL.

Background 
Khan-Pereira was born in Lismore, New South Wales and is of Sri Lankan descent. He played his junior rugby league for the Burleigh Bears.

Playing career

Early career
In 2016, Khan-Pereira was a part of the GIO Cup winning team alongside Tanah Boyd and David Fifita for famous rugby league school, Keebra Park State High School. In 2018, Khan-Pereira signed a development contract with the Gold Coast Titans.

In 2022, Khan-Pereira enjoyed a breakout Queensland Cup season for the Burleigh Bears, scoring 25 tries in just 19 games including three hat-tricks and a four-try effort against the Mackay Cutters.

2023
Khan-Pereira's efforts of the previous season were noticed by Gold Coast Titans coach Justin Holbrook who brought him into the Gold Coast Titans side and underwent pre-season training with their first grade team. In a trial match against the Dolphins, Khan-Pereira scored four tries.

In round 1 of the 2023 NRL season, Khan-Pereira made his first grade debut in his side's 22−10 victory over the Wests Tigers at Leichhardt Oval.
In round 3, Khan-Pereira scored two tries for the Gold Coast in their 38-34 upset victory over Melbourne.

References

External links 
 Titans profile

2001 births
Australian rugby league players
Australian people of Sri Lankan descent
Gold Coast Titans players
Rugby league wingers
Living people